The 2016 Letran Knights men's basketball team represented Colegio de San Juan de Letran in the 92nd season of the National Collegiate Athletic Association in the Philippines. The men's basketball tournament for the school year 2016-17 began on June 25, 2016, and the host school for the season was San Beda College.

The Knights, the Season 91 champions, finished the double round-robin eliminations at sixth place with 9 wins against 9 losses. The Knights missed the Final Four playoffs this season.

Roster 

 Depth chart Depth chart

Coaching changes 
Barely a month after the Knights captured its 17th title, Letran team manager Ricky Paulino confirmed to Letran's school paper, The LANCE, that head coach Aldin Ayo left Letran to coach the De La Salle Green Archers in the UAAP. In the Knights' bonfire celebration, Ayo clarified that the move was not about the money and it was necessary, citing problems with his family and the business.

In March 2016, Letran officials formally named Jeff Napa as the new head coach for the Knights. Napa was hired days after he steered the National University Bullpups to a championship in the UAAP.

Roster changes 
The Knights lost two of its key players from the championship team, Mark Cruz and Kevin Racal, to graduation. Holdovers were Rey Nambatac, McJour Luib, Jom Sollano, JP Calvo and Bong Quinto. Tommy Gedaria, meanwhile, was originally in the roster but did not play this season due to ACL injury. Added to the roster were big men Ato Ular and Jeo Ambohot, transferees from Arellano University.

Suspensions 
The NCAA Management Committee slapped a one-game suspension on Chris Dela Peña, Marco Sario, and Jerrick Balanza after a near-melee that occurred in the game between the Letran Knights and San Beda Red Lions. Balanza was suspended because of his second unsportsmanlike foul, while Dela Peña and Sario were suspended due to entering the court illegally.

NCAA Season 92 games results 

Elimination games were played in a double round-robin format. All games were aired on ABS-CBN Sports and Action.

Source: Pong Ducanes, Imperium Technology

References 

Letran Knights basketball team seasons